George Cisar (August 25, 1910 – February 19, 2010) was a left fielder in Major League Baseball who played briefly for the Brooklyn Dodgers during the  season. He batted and threw right-handed.

Early life and education 

Born in Chicago and raised on the city's Southwest Side, Cisar attended Harrison Technical High School in Chicago.

Baseball career 

Cisar began playing baseball in Chicago and eventually started going to tryouts around the country.  In 1935, he was signed by the Brooklyn Dodgers' Leaksville-Draper-Spray Triplets minor-league team.  After spending all of 1936 and most of 1937 in the minors, Cisar was elevated to the Dodgers in September 1937.

In a 20–game career, Cisar posted a .207 batting average (6–for–29) with eight runs, four runs batted in, and three stolen bases without a home run.

After baseball 

After several more years in the minors, Cisar quit baseball for good after the 1940 season and eventually served in World War II.  After the war, he settled in Cicero, Illinois, and worked as a machinist in Chicago.

At the time of his death, Cisar was the second oldest living MLB player. He is not to be confused with the American character actor of the same name who died in 1979.

Death 

Cisar died on February 19, 2010, in Elmhurst, Illinois.

Personal 

Cisar lived for many years in Cicero, Illinois.  He moved to North Riverside, Illinois, around 2001.

When he was breaking into baseball, Cisar lied about his birth date in order to make himself appear younger than he really was.  As a result, many baseball references give him a 1912 birth date, even though he really was born in 1910, his daughter has said.

References

External links

1910 births
2010 deaths
Major League Baseball left fielders
Brooklyn Dodgers players
People from Cicero, Illinois
Leaksville-Draper-Spray Triplets players
Allentown Brooks players
Clinton Owls players
Nashville Vols players
Elmira Pioneers players
Dayton Wings players
Anniston Rams players
Baseball players from Chicago